Počivalo is a village in the municipality of Štip, North Macedonia.

Demographics
As of the 2021 census, Počivalo had 63 residents with the following ethnic composition:
Turks 60
Persons for whom data are taken from administrative sources 3

According to the 2002 census, the village had a total of 79 inhabitants. Ethnic groups in the village include:
Turks 75
Other 1

References

Villages in Štip Municipality
Turkish communities in North Macedonia